The second series of Top Gear Australia was aired during 2009 on SBS One and consisted if eight episodes, beginning on 11 May and concluding on 29 June. Warren Brown, Steve Pizzati and Australian cousin of the Stig returned for their second series, whilst James Morrison joined the programme replacing Charlie Cox, who left after series one.

This was the final series to be aired on SBS One, as the show moved to Nine Network for the third series. This was also the last series to feature Brown as host as well as the only one to have Morrison.

Episodes

References

Top Gear Australia
2009 Australian television seasons